"Stop It Girl" is a 1986 single from New Kids on the Block. Written and produced by Maurice Starr, it was the second release from their debut album New Kids on the Block.

Track listing
US  Vinyl, 12" 
A Stop It Girl [Extended Dance Mix] 5:18
B Stop It Girl [Radio Edit] 3:47

Personnel

 Danny Wood
 Donnie Wahlberg
 Joey McIntyre
 Jonathan Knight
 Jordan Knight

References

1986 singles
New Kids on the Block songs
Columbia Records singles
Songs written by Maurice Starr
Song recordings produced by Maurice Starr
1986 songs
bubblegum pop songs